Amédée Faure or Victor-Amédée Faure (1801–1878) was a French painter and portraitist.  His portrait subjects include the brothers Louis-Charles, Count of Beaujolais and Antoine Philippe, Duke of Montpensier, and he also specialised in historic scenes of the House of Orléans and the July Monarchy.

External links
Amédée Faure at culture.fr

1801 births
1878 deaths
19th-century French painters
French male painters
19th-century French male artists